Safeguard Defenders is a not-for profit human rights organization which monitors disappearances in China. It was co-founded by Michael Caster. Founded in June 2019 in Madrid, Spain, it operates as a private foundation.

In 2009, activists Peter Dahlin and Michael Caster, from Sweden and the United States respectively, founded China Action, an NGO promoting human rights in China. After some years of low profile activity, the foundation was re-established in Madrid under the name Safeguard Defenders, with a wider scope on Asia, but specialized on China.

In October 2022, Safeguard Defenders published a report on China's Ministry of Public Security's clandestine police stations around the world.

In November 2022, NewsGuard reported that a pro-Chinese government disinformation campaign on Twitter had been launch against Safeguard Defenders.

See also 

 Human rights in China

References 

Foundations based in Spain
2016 establishments in the Community of Madrid
Human rights organizations based in Spain
International nongovernmental organizations